

Overview

Human spaceflight 
The first crewed spaceflight mission was Vostok 1 ("East 1"), carrying the 27-year-old Soviet cosmonaut, Yuri Gagarin, on 12 April 1961. The spacecraft completed one orbit around the globe, lasting about 1 hour and 48 minutes.

On 5 May 1961, NASA astronaut Alan Shepard became the first American in space with his Freedom 7 spacecraft travelling on a suborbital trajectory. Unlike Vostok 1, the mission featured the first manual controlling of the spacecraft and the presence of the pilot within it during landing, the latter making it the first "completed" human spaceflight by formalistic interpretation of past Fédération Aéronautique Internationale definitions.

Deep Space Rendezvous

Notable creations of orbital debris

Orbital launch summary

By country

By rocket

By orbit

References

Footnotes

 
Spaceflight by year